The Chancery Regulation Act 1862 (25 & 26 Vict., c. 42), also known as Rolt's Act was an Act of the United Kingdom Parliament that was an important step in the fusion of law and equity.

Background
From the 13th century in England and Wales, equity developed as a system of justice in parallel with and complementary to the common law. By the 19th century, with the rise of capitalism in Victorian Britain, equity had become very important. The remedies available to the common law were limited to damages and those disputes demanding an injunction or specific performance of a contract needed to be heard in equity which was administered in Courts of Chancery, separate from the common law courts. Moreover, procedure in equity was better able to handle complex disputes involving the relationship between several parties such as partnerships and trusts.

However, the dual jurisdiction of law and equity caused problems for litigants. In equity, all parties had to be represented at all hearings and if one died or married complex procedures were needed to maintain the action. The rate of progress of the action was in the hands of the parties and would tend to be determined by the slowest. Many uncontroversial administrative actions, such as appointing a new trustee, were dealt with as though they were contentious, adding further delay. There were many inefficiencies in procedure with high costs and a certain amount of corruption. Further, cases that involved questions of both law and equity would be hampered, shuttling between the courts of Chancery and common law courts for years, as in Wood v. Scarth.

The Chancery commission (1824–26) made recommendations on streamlining procedure but the commissioners concluded that the Chancery courts themselves had the powers to improve matters.  Over the following decades there was much debate leading to legislation including the Improvement of the Jurisdiction of Equity Act 1852 which allowed Chancery judges to decide questions of fact rather than remitting them to the common law courts. However, by 1862, Chancery judges were still reluctant to make use of these powers so Attorney General Sir John Rolt introduced a bill to make determination of facts by Chancery judges mandatory.

The Act
The purpose of the Act was to require the Court of Chancery to determine every issue of fact or law necessary for the final resolution of the case, and thus to end the practice of sending particular issues in cases pending in Chancery, to be determined in the common law courts.  In the end, the Act was weakened from its initial intentions, allowing matters of fact to referred by a Chancery Judge to be decided by the assizes.

The Act applied to the High Court of Chancery of England and Wales and also to the Court of Chancery of the County Palatine of Lancaster which had an independent jurisdiction in equity. A further Act brought a similar reform to Ireland.

Subsequent developments
The fusion of the administration of law and equity was finally effected in the 1870s by the Judicature Acts.

References

Bibliography
Hansard, HC Deb 26 March 1862 vol 166 cc114-22 114

United Kingdom Acts of Parliament 1862
Acts of the Parliament of the United Kingdom concerning England and Wales
Civil procedure
Equity (law)
Legal history of England